The 1949–50 NCAA men's basketball rankings was made up of a single human poll – the AP Poll – with weekly editions released between January 5, 1950 and March 7, 1950.

Legend

AP Poll

References 

1949-50 NCAA Division I men's basketball rankings
College men's basketball rankings in the United States